Amerila rhodopa is a moth of the subfamily Arctiinae. It was described by Francis Walker in 1865. It is found in India (Sikkim, Nagaland and the southern states).

References
Notes

Sources
 , 2010: Tiger-moths of Eurasia (Lepidoptera, Arctiidae) (Nyctemerini by ). Neue Entomologische Nachrichten 65: 1-106, Marktleuthen.
 , 1864 [1865]: List of the Specimens of Lepidopterous Insects in the Collection of the British Museum 31, suppl.: 321 p., Edward Newman: London.

Moths described in 1865
Amerilini
Moths of Asia